USS Active, a brigantine-rigged packet built at Marshfield, Massachusetts, on the orders of the Continental Congress, was launched in July 1779.

Service history
Under the command of Captain Corbin Barnes, Active made voyages to Bilbao, Spain, in 1780 and to Nantes, France, in 1781. On 23 March 1782, while sailing from Philadelphia to Havana, Cuba, she encountered the British man-of-war  and was captured. The British warship took her into Jamaica where she was condemned as a prize and sold.

Notes
Citations

Bibliography 

Online sources
 

1779 ships
Brigantines of the United States Navy
Captured ships
Packet (sea transport)
Ships built in Marblehead, Massachusetts